Christophe Ajas (born 23 May 1972) is a French former professional footballer who played as a forward. He played nine matches in Ligue 1 for FC Gueugnon.

References

Christophe Ajas career statistics

1972 births
Living people
French footballers
FC Gueugnon players
AS Muret players
LB Châteauroux players
Angoulême Charente FC players
ÉFC Fréjus Saint-Raphaël players
FC Martigues players
Ligue 1 players
Ligue 2 players
Balma SC players
Association football forwards
Footballers from Toulouse